St Lawrence's Church in Denton is a timber-framed church and a Grade II* listed building; it is one of only 29 surviving timber framed churches and chapels in England. The chapelry of Denton was established in 1531 with the construction of the chapel of ease, then Roman Catholic in the Diocese of Lichfield and dedicated to St James.

The church was rededicated to St Lawrence in 1839 and became a parish church in 1854. In 1872, the church was expanded and remodelled by J Medland Taylor and Henry Taylor. The church features sixteenth century stained glass. The church was restored between 1993 and 2003, funded by Tameside MBC. Further restoration began in 2009.

See also

Grade II* listed buildings in Greater Manchester
Listed buildings in Denton, Greater Manchester
List of churches in Greater Manchester

References

Buildings and structures in Tameside
Church of England church buildings in Greater Manchester
Grade II* listed churches in Greater Manchester
Anglican Diocese of Manchester
Medland & Taylor buildings
Churches completed in 1532
16th-century Church of England church buildings
Timber-framed churches
1532 establishments in England
Wooden churches in England
Denton, Greater Manchester